This is a list of rural localities in the Altai Republic. The Altai Republic (Altai: , Altay Respublika) is a federal subject of Russia (a republic). Its capital is the town of Gorno-Altaysk.

Chemalsky District 
Rural localities in Chemalsky District:

 Anos
 Askat
 Ayula
 Beshpeltir
 Chemal
 Cheposh
 Edigan
 Elanda
 Elekmonar
 Karakol
 Kuyus
 Nizhny Kuyum
 Oroktoy
 Tolgoyek
 Turbaza "Katun"
 Uozhan
 Ust-Sema
 Uznezya
 Verkh-Anos

Choysky District 
Rural localities in Choysky District:

 Choya
 Gusevka
 Ishinsk
 Karakoksha
 Kiska
 Krasnoselsk
 Kuzya
 Levinka
 Paspaul
 Salganda
 Seyka
 Sovetskoye
 Sugul
 Sukhoy Karasuk
 Tunzha
 Uskuch
 Uymen
 Ynyrga

Kosh-Agachsky District 
Rural localities in Kosh-Agachsky District:

 Aktal
 Arkyt
 Beltir
 Belyashi
 Chagan-Uzun
 Kokorya
 Kosh-Agach
 Kuray
 Kyzyl-Tash
 Mukhor-Tarkhata
 Novy Beltir
 Ortolyk
 Tashanta
 Telengit-Sortogoy
 Tobeler
 Zhana-Aul

Mayminsky District 
Rural localities in Mayminsky District:

 Aleksandrovka
 Alfyorovo
 Barangol
 Biryulya
 Cheremshanka
 Dubrovka
 Filial
 Izvestkovy
 Karasuk
 Karlushka
 Karym
 Kyzyl-Ozyok
 Manzherok
 Mayma
 Ozernoye
 Podgornoye
 Rybalka
 Souzga
 Sredny Saydys
 Turbaza "Yunost"
 Ulalushka
 Urlu-Aspak
 Ust-Muny
 Verkh-Karaguzh
 Verkhny Saydys

Ongudaysky District 
Rural localities in Ongudaysky District:

 Akbom
 Barkhatovo
 Bichiktu-Boom
 Bolshoy Yaloman
 Boochi
 Inegen
 Inya
 Iodro
 Kara Koby
 Karakol
 Kayarlyk
 Khabarovka
 Kulada
 Kupchegen
 Kurota
 Malaya Inya
 Maly Yaloman
 Neftebaza
 Nizhnyaya Talda
 Onguday
 Ozyornoye
 Shashikman
 Shiba
 Talda
 Tenga
 Tuyekta
 Ulita
 Yelo

Shebalinsky District 
Rural localities in Shebalinsky District:

 Aktel
 Arbayta
 Baragash
 Barlak
 Besh-Ozyok
 Cherga
 Dyektiyek
 Ilyinka
 Kamay
 Kamlak
 Kaspa
 Kukuya
 Kumalyr
 Malaya Cherga
 Mariinsk
 Moguta
 Mukhor-Cherga
 Myuta
 Shebalino
 Shirgaytu
 Topuchaya
 Uluscherga
 Verkh-Apshuyakhta
 Verkh-Cherga

Turochaksky District 
Rural localities in Turochaksky District:

 Artybash
 Biyka
 Chuyka
 Daybovo
 Dmitriyevka
 Iogach
 Kanachak
 Kayashkan
 Kebezen
 Kurmach-Baygol
 Lebedskoye
 Maysk
 Novo-Troitsk
 Ogni
 Ozero-Kureyevo
 Sankin Ail
 Shunarak
 Sovetsky Baygol
 Stary Kebezen
 Suranash
 Syurya
 Talon
 Tondoshka
 Tuloy
 Turochak
 Udalovka
 Ust-Lebed
 Ust-Pyzha
 Verkh-Biysk
 Yaylyu

Ulagansky District 
Rural localities in Ulagansky District:

 Aktash
 Balykcha
 Balyktyul
 Bele
 Chibilya
 Chibit
 Kara-Kudyur
 Kokbesh
 Koo
 Pasparta
 Saratan
 Ulagan
 Yazula

Ust-Kansky District 
Rural localities in Ust-Kansky District:

 Bely Anuy
 Chyorny Anuy
 Karakol
 Kaysyn
 Keley
 Korgon
 Kozul
 Kyrlyk
 Mendur-Sokkon
 Oro
 Ozyornoye
 Sanarovka
 Talitsa
 Turata
 Tyudrala
 Ust-Kan
 Ust-Kumir
 Ust-Muta
 Verkh-Anuy
 Verkh-Muta
 Verkh-Yabogan
 Vladimirovka
 Yabogan
 Yakonur

Ust-Koksinsky District 
Rural localities in Ust-Koksinsky District:

 Abay
 Ak-Koba
 Amur
 Bannoye
 Bashtala
 Berezovka
 Chendek
 Gagarka
 Gorbunovo
 Karagay
 Kastakha
 Katanda
 Kaytanak
 Krasnoyarka
 Krasnoyarka
 Kucherla
 Kurdyum
 Kurunda
 Maralnik-1
 Maralnik-2
 Maralovodka
 Margala
 Multa
 Nizhny Uymon
 Ognyovka
 Oktyabrskoye
 Polevodka
 Sakhsabay
 Siny Yar
 Souzar
 Sugash
 Talda
 Terekta
 Tikhonkaya
 Tuguryuk
 Tyungur
 Ust-Koksa
 Verkh-Uymon
 Vlasyevo
 Yustik
 Zamulta

See also
 
 Lists of rural localities in Russia

References

Altai Republic